"Shanghai'd in Shanghai" is a song and single by Scottish rock group, Nazareth. It was first released in 1974.

Background and chart success
It was taken from their 1974 album Rampant. The song paired with "Love, Now You're Gone" was the fourth of eleven of Nazareth's singles to chart in the UK. It reached 41 in the UK Singles Chart in 1974 staying for four weeks. Single fared more favourably in Austria (number seven) and Switzerland, where it peaked at number four.

Donald A. Guarisco of Allmusic describes the song as "plenty of energy, building from verses with a bluesy swing into a throbbing sing-along chorus that any glam band of 1970s would have killed for". Manny Charlton provided power chords which combined with Dan McCafferty's "gritty" lead vocal.

The song was a radio favourite and also a favourite with fans of the group.

Credits 
 Dan McCafferty - vocals
 Pete Agnew - bass guitar, guitar, background vocals
 Manny Charlton - guitars, producer
 Darrell Sweet - drums, background vocals

 Additional musicians
 Jon Lord - piano
 Vicki Brown, Barry St. John, Liza Strike - background vocals

Charts

References

1974 songs
1974 singles
Nazareth (band) songs
Song recordings produced by Roger Glover
Mooncrest Records singles
Songs written by Dan McCafferty
Songs written by Darrell Sweet (musician)
Songs written by Manny Charlton